Farrag is a surname. It is an Egyptian variant pronunciation of the traditional Arabic Farraj. It should not be confused with Faraj or Farag.

Notable people with the surname include:

Nadja Abd el Farrag, German television presenter and singer
Ryan Farrag, English boxer
Sherif Farrag, Egyptian-American fencer
Wael Farrag, Egyptian football player

See also
Faraj
Farag
Farage (surname)
Ein Farraj, a village located in Wadi al-Uyun Nahiyah in Masyaf District, Hama, Syria